Andersson Rafael Ordóñez Valdéz (born 29 January 1994) is an Ecuadorian footballer who plays as a centre-back for C.D. Universidad Católica del Ecuador.

Honours
L.D.U. Quito
 Ecuadorian Serie A: 2018
Copa Ecuador: 2019
Supercopa Ecuador: 2020, 2021

References

External links
 

1994 births
Living people
Sportspeople from Guayaquil
Ecuadorian footballers
Ecuador under-20 international footballers
Ecuadorian expatriate footballers
Ecuadorian expatriate sportspeople in Germany
Expatriate footballers in Germany
Association football central defenders
Barcelona S.C. footballers
C.D. El Nacional footballers
Eintracht Frankfurt players
L.D.U. Quito footballers
Ecuadorian Serie A players
Bundesliga players